"(You're the) Devil in Disguise" is a 1963 single by Elvis Presley which was written by Bill Giant, Bernie Baum and Florence Kaye. It was published by Elvis Presley Music in June 1963.

The song peaked at No. 3 in the US on the Billboard singles chart on August 10, 1963, and No. 9 on the Billboard Rhythm and Blues singles chart, becoming his last top ten single on the Rhythm and Blues charts. The single was certified "Gold" by the RIAA for sales in excess of 500,000 units in the US. The song also topped Japan's Utamatic record chart in the fall of 1963.

In June 1963, when the song was debuted to a British audience on the BBC television show Juke Box Jury, celebrity guest John Lennon voted the song "a miss" stating on the new song that Elvis Presley was "like Bing Crosby now". The song went on to reach No. 1 in the UK for a single week.

Bill Porter engineered the song for the Elvis Presley recording session on May 26, 1963, at RCA Studios in Nashville. "(You're the) Devil in Disguise" and its flipside, "Please Don't Drag That String Around", were recorded for a full-length album that was scheduled for release in 1963, but RCA chose instead to release the album piecemeal on singles and as soundtrack album bonus tracks.

Bass singer Ray Walker, of the gospel vocal group The Jordanaires (who worked as Presley's backing vocalists for much of his early career), is featured in the song, singing the repeated phrase in a deep voice, in order to represent the devil: "Oh, yes, you are," before the song's fade.

The recording appeared on the 1968 RCA Victor compilation Elvis' Gold Records Volume 4.

Personnel
 Elvis Presley – vocals
 The Jordanaires – backing vocals
 Millie Kirkham - backing vocals
 Scotty Moore – rhythm guitar
 Grady Martin - lead guitar
 Harold Bradley - "tic-tac" bass
 Floyd Cramer – piano
 Bob Moore – double bass
 D. J. Fontana – drums
 Buddy Harman - drums
 Boots Randolph - shakers

Charts and certifications

Weekly charts

Year-end charts

Decade-end charts

Certifications

Other versions
A cover version by Trisha Yearwood appears on the Honeymoon in Vegas soundtrack, which consists mainly of covers of Presley songs. Punk rock band The Misfits covered the song on the extended edition of Project 1950, an album which also contained a cover of Presley's "Latest Flame". Karel Gott recorded the song in 2012. The Residents, Tom Green, Ronnie McDowell, Showaddywaddy, and Peter Kraus have also recorded the song. Scotty Moore and D.J. Fontana have performed the song live in concert.

In 1977, a Finnish band called Kontra covered the song in Finnish titled as "Nainen valepuvussa" in their debut album "Ei kontrollia" (Love Records LRLP 258). Johnny Hallyday recorded the song in French in 1964.

References

External links

1963 songs
1963 singles
Elvis Presley songs
UK Singles Chart number-one singles
Irish Singles Chart number-one singles
Number-one singles in Norway
Number-one singles in Japan
Songs written by Florence Kaye
Songs written by Bill Giant
Songs written by Bernie Baum
RCA Victor singles
Number-one singles in Canada